Rahi (The Wayfarer) is a 1953 Hindi social drama film produced and directed by K. A. Abbas.
The film was based on Mulk Raj Anand's novel "Two Leaves and a Bud" (1937), which was scripted by Abbas. It was produced as a bilingual in Hindi as Rahi and in English as The Wayfarer, under the Naya Sansar banner. Its screenplay was by Mohan Abdullah and  V. P. Sathe and the cinematographer was Ramchandra. The film starred Dev Anand and Nalini Jaywant with Balraj Sahni, David Abraham Cheulkar, Achla Sachdev and Manmohan Krishan.

The story revolved around an ex-army man played by Dev Anand, who takes up a job in a tea estate, only to get disillusioned with the management, and his situation. Nalini Jaywant played his love interest as a tea leaf picker. Her acting was appreciated in the film getting "great critical acclaim".

Plot
Dev Anand is an ex-army officer who gets a job in a tea estate. He is hired as an over-all manager by the English owners. Anand proves a loyal and diligent worker meting out punishment to the workers on the behest of his owners. He falls in love with one of the tea-picking girls (Nalini Jaywant). The workers rebel against the harsh and sometimes brutal management of the estate owners. Nalini Jaywant is shot by the owner in the rioting when the workers get out of control. A gradual change has also come over Anand, especially in his dealings with the tea workers, and losing interest, he leaves the place.

Cast
 Dev Anand as Ramesh
 Nalini Jaywant as Ganga
 Balraj Sahni as Dr. Thomas
 David as Kalu
 Manmohan Krishna as Hari
 Achala Sachdev as Chanda
 Rashid Khan

Soundtrack
The songs composed by Anil Biswas were cited as being melodious. The lyricist was Prem Dhawan and the playback singers were Hemant Kumar, Lata Mangeshkar and Meena Kapoor.

Songs

References

External links
Rahi (1953) at The Hindu
Songs at Muvyz, Ltd

1952 films
1950s Hindi-language films
1952 drama films
Films directed by K. A. Abbas
Films scored by Anil Biswas
Indian drama films
Indian black-and-white films